Maksim Sergeyevich Matyusha (born 4 February 1995) is a Russian football player. He plays for FC Metallurg Lipetsk.

Club career
He made his professional debut in the Russian Professional Football League for FC Vityaz Krymsk on 20 August 2014 in a game against FC Biolog-Novokubansk Progress.

He made his Russian Football National League debut for FC Armavir on 17 July 2018 in a game against FC SKA-Khabarovsk.

References

External links
 

1995 births
People from Dinskoy District
Living people
Russian footballers
Association football goalkeepers
FC Chernomorets Novorossiysk players
FC Armavir players
FC Shinnik Yaroslavl players
FC Metallurg Lipetsk players
Sportspeople from Krasnodar Krai